Tokyo Ghoul is the first season of an anime television series adapted from the manga of the same name by Sui Ishida. The series is produced by Pierrot, and is directed by Shuhei Morita. The series aired from July 4 to September 19, 2014 on Tokyo MX, TVO, TVA, TVQ, BS Dlife and AT-X. This season adapts the first sixty-six chapters of the manga series.

The anime follows Ken Kaneki, a college student who survives an encounter with the binge-eating ghoul Rize Kamishiro, after having her organs transplanted into him. As a result, Ken became a half-ghoul, half-human hybrid, who learns the ghoul lifestyle after working at the ghoul-run cafe "Anteiku." Later he is captured by a dangerous ghoul, named Jason, due to the similarities he shares with Rize.

The score is composed by Yutaka Yamada.

The anime was released in Japan by TC Entertainment, with Marvelous handling the promotion of the series. TC Entertainment released the series onto four volumes, with the first volume being released on September 26, 2014, and the fourth volume being released on December 26, 2014. A complete set containing all twelve episodes was released on June 29, 2016.

In English speaking regions, the series is licensed by Funimation in North America, Madman Entertainment in Australia and New Zealand, and Anime Limited in the United Kingdom and Ireland. Funimation simulcasted the series on their website, produced an English dub, and released the series on home media on September 22, 2015. Madman Entertainment simulcasted the series on AnimeLab, and released the series on November 18, 2015. Anime Limited simulcasted the series on Wakamin, and released the series on September 28, 2015. The series ran on Adult Swim's Toonami programming block in the United States from March 26 to June 25, 2017.

Episode list

Home video release

Notes

References

External links
  

 
 
Tokyo Ghoul episode lists